

D08A Antiseptics and disinfectants

D08AA Acridine derivatives
D08AA01 Ethacridine lactate
D08AA02 Aminoacridine
D08AA03 Euflavine
QD08AA99 Acridine derivatives, combinations

D08AB Aluminium agents

D08AC Biguanides and amidines
D08AC01 Dibrompropamidine
D08AC02 Chlorhexidine
D08AC03 Propamidine
D08AC04 Hexamidine
D08AC05 Polihexanide
D08AC52 Chlorhexidine, combinations
QD08AC54 Hexamidine, combinations

D08AD Boric acid products

D08AE Phenol and derivatives
D08AE01 Hexachlorophene
D08AE02 Policresulen
D08AE03 Phenol
D08AE04 Triclosan
D08AE05 Chloroxylenol
D08AE06 Biphenylol
QD08AE99 Phenol and derivatives, combinations

D08AF Nitrofuran derivatives
D08AF01 Nitrofural

D08AG Iodine products
D08AG01 Iodine/octylphenoxypolyglycolether
D08AG02 Povidone-iodine
D08AG03 Iodine
D08AG04 Diiodohydroxypropane
QD08AG53 Iodine, combinations

D08AH Quinoline derivatives
D08AH01 Dequalinium
D08AH02 Chlorquinaldol
D08AH03 Oxyquinoline
D08AH30 Clioquinol

D08AJ Quaternary ammonium compounds
D08AJ01 Benzalkonium
D08AJ02 Cetrimonium
D08AJ03 Cetylpyridinium
D08AJ04 Cetrimide
D08AJ05 Benzoxonium chloride
D08AJ06 Didecyldimethylammonium chloride
D08AJ08 Benzethonium chloride
D08AJ10 Decamethoxine
D08AJ57 Octenidine, combinations
D08AJ58 Benzethonium chloride, combinations
D08AJ59 Dodeclonium bromide, combinations

D08AK Mercurial products
D08AK01 Mercuric amidochloride
D08AK02 Phenylmercuric borate
D08AK03 Mercuric chloride
D08AK04 Merbromin
D08AK05 Mercury, metallic
D08AK06 Thiomersal
D08AK30 Mercuric iodide
QD08AK52 Phenylmercuric borate, combinations

D08AL Silver compounds
D08AL01 Silver nitrate
D08AL30 Silver

D08AX Other antiseptics and disinfectants
D08AX01 Hydrogen peroxide
D08AX02 Eosin
D08AX03 Propanol
D08AX04 Tosylchloramide sodium
D08AX05 Isopropanol
D08AX06 Potassium permanganate
D08AX07 Sodium hypochlorite
D08AX08 Ethanol
D08AX53 Propanol, combinations

References

D08